The pale gray shrew (Crocidura pergrisea) is a species of mammal in the family Soricidae. It is endemic to Pakistan and is distributed in the Shigar valley and the western edge of Deosai.

References

Sources
 Insectivore Specialist Group 1996.  Crocidura pergrisea.   2006 IUCN Red List of Threatened Species.   Downloaded on 30 July 2007.

Mammals of India
Crocidura
Mammals described in 1913
Taxonomy articles created by Polbot
Endemic fauna of Pakistan